Tearoom may refer to:
 Teahouse, a drinking establishment for tea and sometimes cake or light meals
 A public toilet where cottaging (gay sex) occurs

See also
 Wikipedia:Teahouse, the help space for new Wikipedia editors
 Tearoom Trade: A Study of Homosexual Encounters in Public Places (1970), a book by Laud Humphreys